Bajro Čenanović (born 2 September 1968) was a Bosnia and Herzegovina speed skater. He competed for Yugoslavia in three events at the 1992 Winter Olympics.

References

External links
 

1968 births
Living people
Bosnia and Herzegovina male speed skaters
Olympic speed skaters of Yugoslavia
Speed skaters at the 1992 Winter Olympics
Sportspeople from Sarajevo